The 2024 United States presidential election in Montana is scheduled to take place on Tuesday, November 5, 2024, as part of the 2024 United States elections in which all 50 states plus the District of Columbia will participate. Montana voters will choose electors to represent them in the Electoral College via a popular vote. The state of Montana has four electoral votes in the Electoral College, following reapportionment due to the 2020 United States census in which the state gained a seat.

Incumbent Democratic president Joe Biden has stated that he intends to run for reelection to a second term.

Primary elections

Republican primary 

The Montana Republican primary is scheduled to be held on June 4, 2024, alongside primaries in the District of Columbia, New Jersey, New Mexico, and South Dakota.

General election

Polling
Donald Trump vs. Joe Biden

Ron DeSantis vs. Joe Biden

See also 
 United States presidential elections in Montana
 2024 United States presidential election
 2024 Democratic Party presidential primaries
 2024 Republican Party presidential primaries
 2024 United States elections

Notes

References 

Montana
2024
Presidential